Dandin can refer to:
 Daṇḍin, 6th-7th century Sanskrit writer
 Daṇḍin XY, 20th-21st century musician and author
 Dandin (audio platform), Middle East audio platform.
 The Dandin Group, a wireless internet thinktank
 Dandin the Sword Carrier, a character appearing in Mariel of Redwall and The Bellmaker, two books from the fictional Redwall series by Brian Jacques